The 2017 Ningbo Challenger was a professional tennis tournament played on hard courts. It was the fifth edition of the tournament and part of the 2017 ATP Challenger Tour. It took place in Ningbo, China.

Singles entrants

Seeds

1 Rankings are as of 9 October 2017.

Other entrants 
The following players received wildcards into the singles main draw:
  Gao Xin
  Sun Fajing
  Te Rigele
  Wu Yibing

The following players received entry from the qualifying draw:
  Chung Yun-seong
  Marinko Matosevic
  Jurij Rodionov
  Yosuke Watanuki

Champions

Singles

  Mikhail Youzhny def.  Taro Daniel 6–1, 6–1.

Doubles

  Radu Albot /  Jose Statham def.  Jeevan Nedunchezhiyan /  Christopher Rungkat 7–5, 6–3.

References

Ningbo Challenger
2017 in Chinese tennis